Neiwei railway station is a railway station located in Gushan District, Kaohsiung, Taiwan. It is located on the West Coast line and is operated by Taiwan Railways.It is served by all local trains.

History 
The line the station is on was formerly located at ground level, but has now been moved underground. It opened on 14 October 2018 along with the completed underground railway project in the Kaohsiung area.

Facilities 
The station is located underground and has a ramp from street level, stairs, and a lift. The walls around the entrance have been decorated with mosaic murals.

References

2018 establishments in Taiwan
Railway stations opened in 2018
Railway stations in Kaohsiung
Railway stations served by Taiwan Railways Administration